Alykes is a village in Achaea, Peloponnese, Greece. An estimate of 150 people live permanently there, whose economy is based on fishing.

History and economy
The site of Alykes, meaning "salt pans", is recorded since Venetian times. Along with the salt trade which gave the area its name, in 1865 there existed large storehouses for acorns, which were exported for use in dye production. Alykes was the site of a customs house but did not become a settlement until 1900–5, when the first family, from Spetses settled there. By 1920 there were four families, whose children intermarried; as a result all residents are relatives. Traditionally, the inhabitants of Alykes are all exclusively employed in fishing. The population of the village was barely 50 people in 1940, but had risen to over 200 in the 1991 census.

References 

Populated places in Achaea
Fishing communities
Villages in Greece